Jonathan Andrew Tattersall (born 15 December 1994) is an English cricketer who plays for Yorkshire County Cricket Club. He is a right-handed batsman who bowls leg breaks. He made his debut for the county in the 2013 Yorkshire Bank 40 against Glamorgan. He is a former England under 19s batsman, and his fielding ability saw him fielding as substitute for the England senior side. Tattersall represented England under 19s at the ICC World Cup.

Tattersall was released by Yorkshire in September 2015, but then recalled. He made his first-class debut on 20 June 2018, for Yorkshire in the 2018 County Championship. He made his Twenty20 debut for Yorkshire in the 2018 t20 Blast on 5 July 2018.

References

External links
 

1994 births
Living people
Cricketers from Harrogate
English cricketers
Yorkshire cricketers
Gloucestershire cricketers
Surrey cricketers
English cricketers of the 21st century